Serco-Abellio (formerly Serco-NedRailways) is a joint venture between Serco and Transport UK Group, each owning 50%. The joint venture is the train operating company of the Merseyrail franchise since July 2003 in the Liverpool City Region. It previously operated the Northern Rail franchise in Northern England from December 2004 until March 2016.

Serco-Abellio also lodged unsuccessful bids for the Wales & Borders, West Midlands (which Abellio later successfully bid for itself) and Tyne & Wear Metro franchises. 

Transport UK Group was established in February 2023, following a management buyout of Abellio.

Operations

Merseyrail
In April 2003, Serco-NedRailways was awarded the Merseyrail franchise for 25 years from July 2003.

Northern Rail
In July 2004, Serco-NedRailways was awarded the Northern Rail franchise for six years and nine months from December 2004 with a two-year extension subject to performance targets being achieved.

In May 2010, the Department for Transport confirmed that Northern Rail had met the performance targets and the franchise was extended for two years until September 2013.  In May 2012, the Department for Transport granted Northern Rail a six-month extension until March 2014. In March 2014, the Secretary of State for Transport announced a direct award until 4 February 2016, later extended to 31 March 2016. The franchise was taken over by Arriva Rail North on 1 April 2016.

History

Bids
The joint venture was also shortlisted for a number of other rail franchises:

Wales & Borders in 2003
ScotRail in 2003, but withdrew to concentrate on the Northern Rail franchise. Abellio later successfully bid for the contract itself and Serco successfully bid for the newly separated Caldeonian Sleeper contract itself.
West Midlands in 2007. Abellio later successfully bid for the franchise in a consortium with Mitsui and JR East.
Tyne & Wear Metro in 2009

Partners operating independently

In 2014, it was confirmed that each partner bid independently for the 2016 Northern franchise. Only Abellio made the shortlist of three bidders, however the franchise was awarded to Arriva. The joint venture will continue to operate the Merseyrail franchise until its 2028 conclusion.

Abellio was shortlisted for the London Overground, South Central, Greater Anglia, InterCity West Coast, Essex Thameside and Thameslink, Southern and Great Northern franchises in its own right.

In April 2015, Serco, in its own right, commenced operating the Caledonian Sleeper franchise, while Abellio ScotRail took over the ScotRail franchise.

Abellio managed to keep the Greater Anglia franchise and will operate it until 2025.

In December 2017, West Midlands Trains, a joint venture with East Japan Railway Company and Mitsui in which Abellio owns 70%, commenced operating the West Midlands franchise.

Abellio sale
In 2022, Abellio announced its intention to sell its UK business to a management buyout led by its managing director. Full regulatory approval was received in February 2023, so Abellio became Transport UK Group (TUK).

References

Nederlandse Spoorwegen
Railway companies established in 2002

Serco
2002 establishments in England